Buzavlyk (Bıźawlıq) is a rural locality (a village) in Samarsky Selsoviet, Khaybullinsky District, Bashkortostan, Russia. The population was 352 as of 2010. There are 4 streets.

Geography 
Buzavlyk is located 29 km north of Akyar (the district's administrative centre) by road. Khvorostyanskoye is the nearest rural locality.

References 

Rural localities in Khaybullinsky District